Acetyl-CoA carboxylase 1 also known as ACC-alpha or ACCa is an enzyme that in humans is encoded by the ACACA gene.

Function 

Acetyl-CoA carboxylase (ACC) is a complex multifunctional enzyme system. ACC is a biotin-containing enzyme which catalyzes the carboxylation of acetyl-CoA to malonyl-CoA, the rate-limiting step in fatty acid synthesis. There are two ACC forms, alpha and beta, encoded by two different genes. ACC-alpha is highly enriched in lipogenic tissues. The enzyme is under long term control at the transcriptional and translational levels and under short term regulation by the phosphorylation/dephosphorylation of targeted serine residues and by allosteric transformation by citrate or palmitoyl-CoA.

References

Further reading

External links
 

EC 6.4.1
Human proteins